Craftopia is an American reality streaming television series that premiered on HBO Max on May 27, 2020. In October 2020, the series was renewed for a second season. In August 2022, the series was cancelled.

Premise
Craftopia is a youth-oriented crafting competition, with the contestants' ages ranging from 9 to 15. Contestants are given challenges to create different items within a time period. Before each challenge, the contestants race to fill their carts up with materials from the "store", and then work to craft different creations based on the given instructions. The goal is to build what the judges consider the best creation overall in order to bring home the "Craftrophia and $5,000".

Episodes

Season 1 (2020)

Season 2 (2021)

Production
The show was produced by B17 Entertainment, a subsidiary of Industrial Media, and hosted Lauren Riihimaki, better known as LaurDIY. The series was first announced in October 2019. In April 2020, it was confirmed that Craftopia would launch alongside the streaming service HBO Max on May 27, 2020.

References

External links

2020 American television series debuts
2020s American children's television series
2020s American reality television series
2021 American television series endings
American children's reality television series
Arts and crafts television series
English-language television shows
HBO Max original programming
Television series about children
Television series about teenagers